Veerabhadra is a 2006 Telugu-language action film produced by Ambica Krishna and Ambica Ramanjaneyulu under the Ambika Cinema Productions banner, directed by A. S. Ravi Kumar Chowdary. It stars Nandamuri Balakrishna, Tanushree Dutta and Sada, with music composed by Mani Sharma. The film was recorded as a flop at the box office.

Plot
The film begins at Hyderabad in a colony Adarsa where people of various mindsets reside. Murali Krishna a gallant arrives, along with his handicapped sibling Mallika whom he dotes tremendously, and intentionally rents a house therein. Soon, he nears everyone where a plucky Ashtalakshmi infatuates him. As of today, Murali purposefully admits Mallika into the college of Chevupogu Peddiraju a malignance tycoon who exercises his power from prison. Shockingly, Peddiraju holds an extreme feud with Murali and is in severe hunt of him with his brothers. Plus, their sibling Malathi is Murali’s darling. Then, the brutal are startled to know Murali lives there and charge the colony but he drives them away. Accordingly, residents rebuke him to vacate when Kondaiah the colony owner's true blue appears and states Murali as the heir. 

Frightened, Mallika requests Murali to quit but he remains steadfast, bails out Peddiraju, and barely challenges for confrontation. Following this, Peddiraju attacks Mallika when Murali rushes to her rescue. On the way, a DCP with whom he has earlier conflict bars him. Regardless, Murali raids over them and protects Mallika but he is apprehended. Currently, the knaves’ ploy by attempting to kill DCP incriminates Murali. During that plight, he shields DCP and absconds therefrom. Forthwith, the Police knock on Mallika whilst as a flabbergast, she proclaims that Murali is not her brother, doesn’t have any relation with him and he is just her bodyguard. Later, she reveals to the colony men the reason behind her deed is to secure her brother. Since he is about to turn out for her and spins back. 

Now the tale shifts to Vizag where a Zamindar whose only son knitted a destitute against his wish. At a time, when his son is abroad the girl passes away delivering a baby boy i.e, Murali. Subsequently, Zamindar orders to wipe out the kid. Anyhow, benevolent Kondaiah bestows him on a drunkard Pothuraju. Years roll by, and Murali grows up as a man of the masses who shares the hardships of the poor. Whereat, he impedes the oppressions of DCP. Moreover, he endears & cares for the Pothuraju family but they exploit and neglect him because of their selfish nature. One time, Pothuraju counterfeits Murali by randomly picking up a photograph of Malathi and posing as his fiance’. Taking it into account, Murali chases Malathi but afterward, he affirms the actuality and apologizes to her when she crushes. Today, Zamindar is under endangering as he keeps a land dispute with Peddiraju, and to squat it he ruthlessly amputates Mallika’s leg. 

Parallelly, Malathi proposes Murali when Peddiraju’s brothers' assaults, and are counteracted by Murali’s adherents. Zamindar is stunned sighting the tremendous vast acolytes of Murali and proceeds for his aid. At that point, he is aware of Murali as his grandson, ergo, he bribes Pothuraju and makes him kick Murali out. Immediately, Kodaiah contacts Murali to divulge his past. Above, Mallika entreaties him for help when he delightfully embraces her. By the time they reach home, Peddiraju slays Zamindar. Before dying, he is remorseful to Murali and endorses Mallika’s responsibility to him. Here, infuriated Murali flares up and is on the verge to kill Peddiraju when he surrenders himself for safety. Next, he is shifted to Hyderabad Murali announces he too lands there, as his presence should panic him. Listening to it, the colony members console Mallika. Presently, DCP is undercover for Murali who is being treated secretly. Thus, Peddiraju conspires to let out Murali declaring the nuptial of Malathi. However, Murali reprisals it with support from Ashtalakshmi & Malathi. Meanwhile, DCP recoups asserts Murali is guiltless. At last, Murali ceases the baddies. Finally, the movie ends on a happy note with the marriage of Murali & Malathi.

Cast

Soundtrack

Music was composed by Mani Sharma. Music was released on Supreme Music Company.

References

External links
 

2006 films
Films scored by Mani Sharma
2000s Telugu-language films